Sulu's 2nd congressional district is a congressional district in the province of Sulu. It has been represented in the House of Representatives of the Philippines since 1987. The district encompasses the eastern half of Jolo island, composed of five municipalities, as well as the eastern outlying islands of Tongkil (Banguingui) and the southern outlying islands of Lugus, Pandami, Pata, Siasi and Tapul. It is currently represented in the 18th Congress by Abdulmunir Mundoc Arbison of the Nacionalista Party (NP).

Representation history

Election results

2019

2016

2013

2010

See also
Legislative districts of Sulu

References

Congressional districts of the Philippines
Politics of Sulu
1987 establishments in the Philippines
Congressional districts of Bangsamoro
Constituencies established in 1987